Anti-Müllerian hormone receptor is a receptor for the anti-Müllerian hormone. Furthermore, anti-Mullerian hormone receptor type 2 is a protein in humans that is encoded by the AMHR2 gene.

Function
Both men and women have this gene

Pathology
The anti-Müllerian hormone receptor (Müllerian Inhibiting Substance Type II Receptor) can be responsible for persistent Müllerian duct syndrome.

Müllerian inhibiting substance type II receptor (MISIIR), also known as the Anti-Müllerian Hormone Receptor, is expressed by ovarian, breast, and prostate cancers and these cancer cells have been reported to apoptose in response to exposure to the Müllerian inhibiting substance (MIS).

Antibodies have been developed that specifically target MISIIR and may be useful as vehicles for drugs and toxins for targeted cancer therapy.

References

Further reading

External links
 

EC 2.7.11